Belgium was represented by Jacques Hustin, with the song "Fleur de liberté", at the 1974 Eurovision Song Contest, which took place on 6 April in Brighton, England. Hustin was the winner of the Belgian national final for the contest, held on 14 January.

Before Eurovision

Eurosong 
French-language broadcaster RTB was in charge of the selection of the Belgian entry for the 1974 Contest. Six songs, all performed by Hustin, competed in the final (the venue and host are currently unknown) and the winner was chosen by postcard voting.

It is not known whether full results were given, or just the winner announced.

At Eurovision 
On the night of the final Hustin performed 11th in the running order, following Monaco and preceding the Netherlands. The voting system tried between 1971 and 1973 was abandoned, and for 1974 returned to the previous system of ten jury members in each country awarding one vote each. At the close of the voting "Fleur de liberté" had received 10 points, placing Belgium 9th of the 17 competing entries.

Voting

References 

1974
Countries in the Eurovision Song Contest 1974
Eurovision